SuperValu is a chain of franchised and associated grocery stores in Canada that currently operates in the province of British Columbia and Alberta.

Background 

Founded in British Columbia in 1951 by Loblaw Companies Limited as a chain of independently-owned supermarkets supplied by Loblaws' wholesale subsidiary, Kelly Douglas & Company.  In the 1960s, 1970s and 1980s, many SuperValu stores were created from former Loblaws corporate stores as the banner expanded across western Canada. Loblaw Companies Limited (through its Westfair Foods division) still supplies SuperValu stores and owns the SuperValu name.

In the mid-1970s, a larger version of SuperValu was created - dubbed the Real Canadian Superstore, these warehouse-sized grocery stores were closer to department stores in scope. Today, only a handful of smaller SuperValu stores remain, all in British Columbia. Most others have either been rebranded to other Loblaw banners, such as Extra Foods, Your Independent Grocer or expanded into Real Canadian Superstore outlets (or the related Real Canadian Wholesale Club). Atlantic SuperValu stores have since been replaced by the larger Atlantic Superstore.

See also
 List of supermarket chains in Canada

External links
Site for SuperValu outlet in Vancouver
Site for SuperValu outlet in Gibsons, BC
SuperValu radio jingle from the mid-1960s (MP3)
Local newspaper article on closure of Campbell River SuperValu outlet

Loblaw Companies
Supermarkets of Canada

Food and drink companies based in British Columbia
Food and drink companies based in Alberta